Transmembrane protein 247 (also known as TMEM247 or transmembrane protein ENSP00000343375) is a multi-pass transmembrane protein of unknown function found in Homo sapiens encoded by the TMEM247 gene. Notable in the protein are two transmembrane regions near the c-terminus of the translated polypeptide. Transmembrane protein 247 has been found to be expressed almost entirely in the testes.

Gene attributes

General information 
The TMEM247 gene is located on chromosome 2 at c2p21, nucleotide: 46,479,565-46,484,425. It has three exons and two introns. TMEM247 is 4,861 nucleotides (nt) long pre-mRNA processing, reduced to 661 nt after mRNA processing and its protein product is 219 amino acids (aa) long. The gene does not include a stop codon as most genes do, but instead has a stop codon created by the process of polyadenylation during mRNA processing. Due to this, TMEM247 has no 3' UTR (untranslated region). TMEM247 codes only for one variant.

Promoter region 
The promoter region of TMEM247 has a huge variety of predicted binding sites in the promoter region associated with the gene. Twenty potential interactions of interest have been collected below, though many more exist. Anchor base positions are based on distance from the start of the gene's promoter region, which itself is 1302 base pairs long.

There are a number of notable predicted binding sites on the TMEM247 promoter, as well as a notable omission. The promoter lacks a traditional TATA box, the typical binding site for proteins that recruit RNA Polymerase and begin the process of transcription. Instead, TMEM247 contains several predicted binding sites which are core promoter elements for TATA-less promoters.

TMEM247 has a promoter region that also contains a significant number of predicted development-related binding sites, such as pluripotent stem cell related factors (Oct4, Sox2, Nanog), sex-determining HMG box factors, and various homeobox/homeodomain binding sites.

Protein attributes
The TMEM247 gene codes for a single protein, transmembrane protein 247 (also referred to as TMEM247). TMEM247 has two transmembrane domains at the c-terminus of the protein as part of its multi-pass transmembrane protein structure. They are identical in length at 21 amino acids each, and are separated by a span of six amino acids. TMEM247 has a predicted molecular weight of 25 kilodaltons, and a predicted isoelectric point of 5.

In composition, TMEM247 has a significantly higher amount of methionine when compared to the set of all human proteins. It also has slightly elevated levels of glutamic acid in the same analysis. The charge distribution of amino acids comprising TMEM247 is relatively uniform. Two predicted hydrophobic segments exist in the protein which match with the known two transmembrane regions.

Protein domains
Transmembrane protein 247 has two transmembrane domains. The three regions of the protein that remain are predicted to be outside of the membrane it resides in on the N- and C-terminus of the protein, while the segment between the protein's two transmembrane regions is predicted to reside inside of the membrane.

Analysis of TMEM247 predicts that it localizes in the cell at the endoplasmic reticulum. In this case, inner predicted domains would be inside the ER and outer predicted domains would reside in the cytoplasm.

Predicted post-translational modifications 
Transmembrane protein 247 has a variety of predicted post-translational modifications that may affect protein function. Predicted modifications include O-beta-GlcNAc attachment, Glycation, and O-glycosylation.

Predicted kinase interactions 
Protein kinases may modify transmembrane protein 247, and a variety of sites along the translated protein have been predicted to be kinase binding sites. These are represented by red squares surrounding the potential bound amino acids in the conceptual translation and listed in the table below. Predicted kinase interactions are listed in the order of the score of their prediction (higher, lower).

Protein structure 
Transmembrane protein 247 has a predicted secondary structure which includes two major features in the form of beta sheets that reside near its determined transmembrane regions. This is slightly unusual for transmembrane proteins, whose transmembrane regions are often alpha helices.

Evolutionary history

Orthologs 
TMEM247 has several hundred orthologs, with its most distant fully sequenced available ortholog being Anolis carolinensis. These orthologs are exclusive to land-based animals, as clades with an evolutionary origin before reptiles are not represented. The fact that TMEM247 has no relatives before the green anole makes it likely that the gene was novel when it appeared in an ancestor of the species, and was nonexistent before the evolution of reptiles. Classes represented in the orthologs include mammalia, aves, and reptilia.

Most orthologs within mammalia are strongly conserved across the entire gene, including a very highly conserved region near the center of the translated protein. The highest evolutionary conservation is centered around the transmembrane regions of the protein, which are highly conserved in all orthologous species.

Paralogs 
In humans, TMEM247 has a single paralog (hCG17037) that has a sequence which theoretically would translate into a protein which is identical to that produced by TMEM247 aside from seven positions constituting a 96.8% similarity, including two deletions that reduce the total amino acid count from 219 to 217. The extreme similarity of the TMEM247 gene and its paralog make it a likely result of gene duplication.

Paralog alignment

Significance/function
TMEM247 has no major known effects or uses in a clinical setting. There are several studies that indicate TMEM247, despite being found almost exclusively in the testes, does not play a significant role in reproduction. Further studies have revealed an association with variants in TMEM247 and coronary artery disease, though not of major significance.

A mutation in TMEM247 has been noted to be unusually common in populations of Tibetan highlanders. The exact mutation is rs116983452, a change at nucleotide position 248 in the gene from cystine to tyrosine, which causes a missense in the protein product of alanine to valine.

While the function of TMEM247 is unknown, it is notable for its polyadenylation-synthesized stop codon. Some research has shown that genes which rely on polyadenylation for the creation of stop codons are relatively common in a human parasite, Blastocystis.

References 

Genes on human chromosome 2